The 1926 College Football All-America team is composed of college football players who were selected as All-Americans by various organizations and writers that chose College Football All-America Teams in 1926. The six selectors recognized by the NCAA as "official" for the 1926 season are (1) Collier's Weekly, as selected by Grantland Rice with cooperation from ten coaches, (2) the Associated Press, based on polling of "more than 100 coaches and critics", (3) the United Press, (4) the All-America Board, selected by Knute Rockne (Notre Dame), Glenn "Pop" Warner (Stanford), and Tad Jones (Yale), (5) the International News Service (INS), and (6) the Newspaper Enterprise Association (NEA).

Other notable selectors included Billy Evans, the Central Press Association, the New York Sun, and Walter Eckersall.

Consensus All-Americans
For the year 1926, the NCAA recognizes six All-American teams as "official" designations for purposes of its consensus determinations. The following chart identifies the NCAA-recognized consensus All-Americans and displays which first-team designations they received.

All-American selections for 1926

Ends
Bennie Oosterbaan, Michigan (CFHOF) (AAB-1; AP-3; COL-1; NEA; UP; CEP-1; WC-1; BE-1; RG-2; ES-1; WE-1)
Vic Hanson, Syracuse (CFHOF) (AAB-2; AP-1; COL-1; INS-1; UP; CP-2; NYS-1; BE-2; HF-1; LP-1; RJW-2; RG-2; DW-1; ES-1; WE-1)
Hal Broda, Brown (AAB-3; AP-2; INS-2; UP; CP-1; NYS-1; BE-3; HF-1; LP-2; RWJ-3; RG-1; ES-2; WE-2)
Hoyt Winslett, Alabama (AAB-2; AP-1; INS-1; NEA; CP-2; NYS-2; BE-1; LP-1, RWJ-2; ES-2; WE-3; CP-1)
Ted Shipkey, Stanford (AAB-1; AP-2; INS-2; WC-1; NYS-2; BE-2; LP-2; RG-1; WE-2)
Carl Bacchus, Missouri (AAB-3; AP-3; BE-3; RWJ-3)
 Cal Hubbard, Geneva (INS-3; RG-3; CEP-1)
 Ed Lindenmeyer, Missouri  (INS-3)
 George Thayer, Penn (WE-3)
 Charles Born, Army (RG-3)

Tackles
Frank Wickhorst, Navy (AAB-1; AP-1; COL-1; INS-1; NEA; UP; CP-1; WC-1; NYS-1; BE-1; HF-1; LP-1; RG-1; WE-1; CEP-1)
Bud Sprague, Army (AP-1; CP-1; RG-3; CEP-1; LP-2)
Lloyd Yoder, Carnegie Tech (CFHOF) (AAB-1; AP-3; INS-2; CP-2; WC-1)
Lon Stiner, Nebraska (AAB-2; INS-1; RWJ-2; ES-2)
Robert Johnson, Northwestern (NEA; BE-1; RG-1; WE-2)
Alfred "Al" Lassman, NYU (AAB-3; UP; BE-3; HF-1; RWJ-3; RG-2; ES-1; WE-2)
Orland Smith, Brown (AP-3; COL-1; LP-1; NYS-2; WE-1)
Spike Nelson, Iowa (AP-2; CP-2; NYS-1; BE-2; LP-2; RG-3)
Theodore "Tiny" Roebuck, Haskell (AAB-2; RWJ-2)
Jim Dixon, Oregon State (AAB-3; INS-2; RWJ-3)
D. Thomas Eddy, Navy (AP-2; NYS-2; ES-2)
Fred Pickhard, Alabama (BE-2)
Jesse Hibbs, USC (BE-3)
Howard D. Cothran, Lafayette (RG-2; WE-3)
Leo Raskowski, Ohio State (INS-3; ES-1; WE-3)
 Ed Kevorkian, Brown (INS-3)

Guards
Bernie Shively, Illinois (CFHOF) (AAB-1; AP-1; COL-1; INS-1; NEA; CP-2; WC-1; BE-1; RG-2; WE-1)
Harry Connaughton, Georgetown (AAB-2; AP-1; COL-1; INS-2; NEA; UP; CP-1; NYS-1; BE-1; HF-1; LP-1; RWJ-2; RG-1; ES-1; WE-1)
Ed Hess, Ohio State (AAB-2; AP-2; INS-2; CP-1; NYS-2; BE-2; HF-1; LP-2; RWJ-2; RG-1; ES-1; WE-2; CEP-1)
 Edwin Hayes, Ohio State (UP)
Fred H. Swan, Stanford (AAB-3; AP-3; INS-3; CP-2; RWJ-3; ES-2; CEP-1; LP-2)
Herbert Sturhahn, Yale (CFHOF) (AAB-1; AP-3; WC-1; NYS-2; BE-3; ES-2; LP-1; RG-3; WE-2)
Ted "Butter" Gorrell, USC (AAB-3; RWJ-3)
Emerson Carey, Cornell (AP-2; RWJ-2; WE-3; RG-3)
Ernest Schmidt, Army (NYS-1; BE-2)
Orland Smith, Brown (INS-1; BE-3; RG-2)
 Frank Mayer, Notre Dame (INS-3)
John H. Lovette, Michigan (WE-3)

Centers
Bud Boeringer, Notre Dame (AAB-1; AP-1; COL-1; INS-1; NEA; CP-1; WC-1; NYS-1; BE-1; LP-1; RG-1; ES-1; WE-1)
John J. Butler, Penn (AP-2; INS-3; UP; CP-2; BE-2; HF-1; RG-2; ES-2; WE-2)
Jeff Cravath, USC (AAB-2; INS-2; RWJ-2)
Larry Bettencourt, St. Mary's (CA) (CFHOF) (AAB-3; RWJ-3)
Polly Wallace, Oklahoma (AP-3)
Alex Klein, Ohio State (BE-3)
Maurice Daly, Army (NYS-2)
Robert Reitsch, Illinois (RG-3; WE-3)
 Joseph Truskowski, Michigan (LP-2)

Quarterbacks
Benny Friedman, Michigan (CFHOF) (AAB-2; AP-1; COL-1; INS-1; NEA; CP-1; NYS-1; BE-1; HF-1; LP-1; RWJ-2; RG-1; ES-1; WE-1)
Bill Spears, Vanderbilt (CFHOF) (AAB-3 [as hb]; AP-2; INS-2; NYS-2; BE-2; LP-2; RWJ-3 [as hb])
Bill Kelly, Montana (CFHOF) (AP-2 [as hb]; BE-3 [as hb]; CP-2; RG-2; WE-3)
Roy Randall, Brown (AAB-1; WC-1)
 Butch Meeker, Washington State (WE-2)
George Guttormsen, Washington (AP-3; INS-3)
Gerald Mann, SMU (CFHOF) (AAB-3; BE-3; RWJ-3)
 Dan Caulkins, Princeton (RG-3)

Halfbacks
Mort Kaer, USC (CFHOF) (AAB-1; AP-1; COL-1; INS-1; NEA; CP-1; WC-1; NYS-1; BE-1; RG-1; ES-2 [as qb]; WE-1)
Ralph Baker, Northwestern (CFHOF) (AAB-2; AP-1; COL-1; INS-2; CP-1; NYS-1; BE-2; LP-1; RWJ-2; RG-2; ES-2; WE-1)
Harry Wilson, Army (AAB-1; AP-2; INS-1; NEA; CP-2; WC-1; ES-1)
 Tom Hamilton, Navy (UP; HF-1; RG-3; WE-2)
Marty Karow, Ohio State (UP; ES-2; WE-3)
Frank Kirkleski, Lafayette (AAB-3; AP-3; RWJ-3)
Charles Rogers, Penn (AP-3; INS-3; UP; HF-1; RG-1; WE-2)
Chester "Cotton" Wilcox, Purdue (NYS-2; LP-2; RG-3; BE-2)
George Bogue, Stanford (BE-3; WE-3)
Christie Flanagan, Notre Dame (AAB-2; CP-2; RWJ-2; RG-2; ES-1)
Dave Mishel, Brown (INS-2)
George Wilson, Lafayette (INS-3; BE-1; NYS-2)
 Dick Hyland, Stanford (LP-1)

Fullbacks
Herb Joesting, Minnesota (CFHOF) (AAB-1; AP-1; COL-1; INS-1; NEA; BE-1; CP-1; ES-1; NYS-1; RG-1; LP-1; WC-1; WE-1)
Marty Karow, Ohio State (AP-2; INS-3; CP-2; BE-3; HF-1; LP-2; RG-2)
Bill Amos, Washington & Jefferson (AAB-2; INS-2; BE-2; RWJ-2; WE-2)
Mayes McLain, Haskell (AAB-3; RWJ-3)
Ty Rauber, Washington & Lee (AP-3)
Harry O'Boyle, Notre Dame (LP-2 [hb]; NYS-2)
Henry H. Caldwell, Navy (ES-2)
Loren Lewis, Northwestern (RG-3; WE-3)

Key
 Bold – Used for (1) consensus All-Americans and (2) first-team selections by an official selector
 CFHOF = College Football Hall of Fame inductee
 1 – First-team selection
 2 – Second-team selection
 3 – Third-team selection

Official selectors
 AAB = All-American Board, team selected by three coaches: Knute Rockne (Notre Dame), Glenn "Pop" Warner (Stanford), and Tad Jones (Yale)
 AP = Associated Press, based on AP polling of "more than 100 coaches and critics"
 UP = United Press
 COL = Collier's Weekly as selected by Grantland Rice with cooperation from ten coaches: Glenn Warner (Stanford), Robert Zuppke (Illinois), G.C. Woodruff (Georgia), Knute Rockne (Notre Dame), Wallace Wade (Alabama), Captain J.J. McEwan (Oregon), W.A. Alexander (Ga. Tech.), Howard Jones (So. Calif.), E.P. Madigan (St. Mary's, Calif.), and Dan McGuigan (Vanderbilt).
 INS = International News Service, selected by Davis Walsh
 NEA = Newspaper Enterprise Association

Other selectors
 BE = Billy Evans
 CP = Central Press Association, based on a poll conducted by Norman Brown of over 400 newspapers, each of which conducted its own election in which fans voted for the All-American team; Central Press reported compiling a million votes.
 CEP = Charles E. Parker for the New York World News Service
 ES = Ed Sullivan
 HF = Henry Farrell of the United Press
 LP = Lawrence Perry
 NYS = New York Sun
 RG = Red Grange
 WC = Walter Camp Football Foundation
 WE = Walter Eckersall

See also
 1926 All-Big Ten Conference football team
 1926 All-Missouri Valley Conference football team
 1926 All-Pacific Coast football team
 1926 All-Southern college football team

References

All-America Team
College Football All-America Teams